Newton is an area of Hyde, Greater Manchester, England, which occupies a narrow strip of land from the River Tame near Newton Hall to Matley, between Hyde and Dukinfield.

Newton can be divided into four separate parts, working uphill from the river:
 Newton Green
 Flowery Field
 Newton Moor
 Newton

On Matley Lane lies the former site of Shaw Hall factory.

Governance
Newton is part of the Stalybridge and Hyde constituency, whose Member of Parliament is currently Jonathan Reynolds of the Labour Co-operative party. Newton was previously in the North West England European Parliament constituency.

Newton is in Tameside Metropolitan Borough Council, which was formed in 1974 and whose council offices are in Ashton-Under-Lyne.

Transport

Newton is served by Newton for Hyde railway station and Flowery Field railway station, which both lie on the Glossop Line and are operated by Northern.

Bus services in Newton include the 343, which runs from Hyde to Oldham via Dukinfield and Stalybridge. This service is run by Stagecoach Manchester. Also, the 346 service runs to Hyde and Ashton-Under-Lyne, and at evenings Gee Cross via Newton, and is run by Stagecoach Manchester and First Greater Manchester.

Education
Newton is served by both primary and secondary schools, which include;
 Flowery Field Primary School
 St Paul's Catholic Primary & Nursery school
 Oakfield Primary School
 Flowery Field Primary School
 Hyde Community College

Notable People 

 Michael Barber (1934 - 1991), chemist and mass spectrometrist, best known for his invention of fast atom bombardment ionisation; born at 166 Lodge Lane in Newton

References

 Manchester Evening News

Areas of Greater Manchester
Geography of Tameside
Hyde, Greater Manchester